Somaram is a village and panchayat in Ranga Reddy district, Telangana, India. It comes under Medchal mandal.

References

Villages in Ranga Reddy district